Jette Andersen (born 29 August 1945) is a Danish middle-distance runner. She competed in the women's 800 metres at the 1964 Summer Olympics.

References

External links

1945 births
Living people
Athletes (track and field) at the 1964 Summer Olympics
Danish female middle-distance runners
Olympic athletes of Denmark